Svenska Serien (literally, "The Swedish Series", also Svenska Fotbollserien, "The Swedish Football Series") was the highest league in Swedish football, and was played 1910–1917, 1920–1921, and 1922–1924. It was then replaced by the current-day league Allsvenskan. Despite being the highest league, the winner of Svenska Serien did not become Swedish Champions; instead, that title was awarded to the winner of the cup tournament Svenska Mästerskapet between 1896 and 1925.

Previous winners

League champions

See also 
All-time Svenska Serien table

References 

Print

Online

 
Defunct football competitions in Sweden